France has a rich selection of Gold and Silver commemorative coins. These coins are minted by Monnaie de Paris, which is a state owned industrial and commercial company.

Gold

€10

€20

Silver

€0.25

€1.00

€1.50

€5

€20

Notes

References 

 

France
Coins of France
2006 in France